The Warner/Reprise Loss Leaders were a series of promotional sampler compilation albums released by Warner Bros. Records throughout the 1970s. Each album (usually a 2-record set) contained a wide variety of tracks by artists under contract to Warner Bros. and its subsidiary labels (primarily Reprise Records); often these were singles, B-sides, non-hit album tracks, or otherwise obscure material, all designed to arouse interest in the artists' regular albums. Also found on some were humorous, bizarre interstitial audio material—clips from old records and movies, short skits, found sound, etc.--and most albums featured clever, humorous cover art and liner notes. Most of the 1970s albums were compiled and annotated by Barry Hansen, better known as Dr. Demento.

Overview 
Warner advertised the Loss Leaders albums by magazine and by inserting special illustrated inner sleeves in all of its regular album releases, listing all of the currently available Loss Leaders and including an order form. Each Loss Leader double album was priced at US$2, significantly less than a comparable regular-release double album of the time. (There were also a few single disc issues in 1969-71, and at least one triple disc set.) The fact that Warner sold these double albums at low cost in hopes of increasing sales of their regular releases is the source of the series name Loss Leaders.

The first Loss Leaders compilation was The 1969 Warner/Reprise Songbook, featuring a wide range of artists from Miriam Makeba to the Mothers of Invention; the last of the original series was the punk and new wave-themed Troublemakers in 1980.

Loss Leaders Revisited (PRO-CD-7955, 1995), a limited-edition CD (3500 copies) and  Loss Leaders 2 (PRO-CD-9949, 1999) a limited-edition CD (2500 copies), were not properly Loss Leader releases, since they were given away. There have been no further Loss Leaders releases.

List
 The 1969 Warner/Reprise Songbook
 The 1969 Warner/Reprise Record Show
 October 10, 1969
 The Big Ball
 Schlagers!
 Zappéd
 Looney Tunes & Merrie Melodies (3 LP)
 Non-Dairy Creamer
 Hot Platters
 Together
 The Whole Burbank Catalog
 Middle of the Road
 Burbank
 The Days of Wine and Vinyl
 Appetizers
 All Singing - All Talking - All Rocking
 Hard Goods
 Peaches
 Deep Ear
 The Force
 All Meat
 Peaches, Vol. 2
 I Didn't Know They Still Made Records Like This
 The Works
 Supergroup
 The People's Record
 Cook Book
 Limo
 Collectus Interruptus
 Pumping Vinyl
 A La Carte
 Monsters
 Eclipse
 Music with 58 Musicians, Volume 1
 Troublemakers
 Loss Leaders Revisited
 Loss Leaders 2

See also 
 Sampler (record)

External links 
 Loss Leaders series overview

References 

Compilation album series
Sampler albums
Warner Records albums